Sehra Teri Pyas is a Pakistani drama television series first broadcast on PTV Home on 13 September 2011. It features Sanam Baloch, Imran Arooj, Nirvaan Nadeem, Kamran Mujahid and Farah Tufail and Jamil Fakhri in the leading cast.

Cast 
 Sanam Baloch as Faiza Ali Shah
 Nirvaan Nadeem
 Imran Arooj
 Kamran Mujahid
 Firdous Jamal
 Farah Tufail
 Jameel Fakhri
 Affan Waheed
 Humaira Ali as Ameer Bibi

References 

Pakistani drama television series
Urdu-language television shows
Pakistan Television Corporation original programming